Zoomer may refer to:

Electronics
 Tandy Zoomer, a personal digital assistant
 Zoomer (NES accessory), a joystick peripheral for the Nintendo Entertainment System
 Zoomer, a robotic toy dog

Media
 ZoomerMedia, a Canadian media group
 Zoomer Radio, a Canadian Radio station (also known as CFZM)

Music
 Zoomer (album), by Schneider TM
 "Zoomer" (song), a single by the duo Les Jumo
 At Mount Zoomer, album released by Wolf Parade

Other uses
 A former Philadelphia-based restaurant delivery company, now merged with EatStreet
 Honda Zoomer, a motorscooter
 Zoomer, an alternate name for a person of Generation Z

See also
 Zooomr, a photo-sharing website
 Zoom (disambiguation)